

N07A Parasympathomimetics

N07AA Anticholinesterases
N07AA01 Neostigmine
N07AA02 Pyridostigmine
N07AA03 Distigmine
N07AA30 Ambenonium
N07AA51 Neostigmine, combinations

N07AB Choline esters
N07AB01 Carbachol
N07AB02 Bethanechol

N07AX Other parasympathomimetics
N07AX01 Pilocarpine
N07AX02 Choline alfoscerate
N07AX03 Cevimeline

N07B Drugs used in addictive disorders

N07BA Drugs used in nicotine dependence
N07BA01 Nicotine
N07BA03 Varenicline
N07BA04 Cytisinicline

N07BB Drugs used in alcohol dependence
N07BB01 Disulfiram
N07BB02 Calcium carbimide
N07BB03 Acamprosate
N07BB04 Naltrexone
N07BB05 Nalmefene

N07BC Drugs used in opioid dependence
N07BC01 Buprenorphine
N07BC02 Methadone
N07BC03 Levacetylmethadol
N07BC04 Lofexidine
N07BC05 Levomethadone
N07BC06 Diamorphine
N07BC51 Buprenorphine, combinations

N07C Antivertigo preparations

N07CA Antivertigo preparations
N07CA01 Betahistine
N07CA02 Cinnarizine
N07CA03 Flunarizine
N07CA04 Acetylleucine
N07CA52 Cinnarizine, combinations

N07X Other nervous system drugs

N07XA Gangliosides and ganglioside derivatives

N07XX Other nervous system drugs
N07XX01 Tirilazad
N07XX02 Riluzole
N07XX03 Xaliproden
N07XX04 Sodium oxybate
N07XX05 Amifampridine
N07XX06 Tetrabenazine
N07XX07 Fampridine
N07XX08 Tafamidis
N07XX10 Laquinimod
N07XX11 Pitolisant
N07XX12 Patisiran
N07XX13 Valbenazine
N07XX14 Edaravone
N07XX15 Inotersen
N07XX16 Deutetrabenazine
N07XX17 Arimoclomol
N07XX18 Vutrisiran
N07XX59 Dextromethorphan, combinations

References

N07